Hazelrigg is an unincorporated community in Jefferson Township, Boone County, in the U.S. state of Indiana.

History
A post office was established at Hazelrigg in 1873, and remained in operation until it was discontinued in 1935. It was named for H. G. Hazelrigg, the original owner of the town site.

Geography

References

Unincorporated communities in Boone County, Indiana
Unincorporated communities in Indiana
Indianapolis metropolitan area